Danny Petrus Hesp (born 19 October 1969) is a Dutch former professional footballer who played as a defender.

Football career
Born in Amsterdam, Hesp started at local Ajax, but only appeared in nine Eredivisie games in three seasons combined, all in his first. A very promising player, he broke his leg after a sliding tackle in 1988 and never fully recovered to reach his full potential.

Released in 1990, Hesp resumed his career with Heerenveen, going to play until 2005 with several clubs in the top level (Roda, AZ, NEC and RBC) and also spending three seasons – two complete, two halves – with second division's Top Oss.

Life after football
In 2005, Hesp became president of the Vereniging van Contractspelers (VVCS), the Dutch union for professional soccer players, and in 2013 announced he would function as a contact for gay soccer players, to assist them in their coming-out; a 2014 poll by the VVCS and the John Blankenstein Foundation indicated that soccer's culture of machismo was an important cause of homophobia in the sport.

Personal life
Hesp's older brother, Ruud, was also a professional footballer. A goalkeeper, he was best known for his three-year stint with Spain's Barcelona; the pair played together in the 1995–96 campaign, at Roda.

References

External links
Beijen profile 
Stats at Voetbal International 

1969 births
Living people
Footballers from Amsterdam
Dutch footballers
Association football defenders
Eredivisie players
Eerste Divisie players
AFC Ajax players
SC Heerenveen players
TOP Oss players
Roda JC Kerkrade players
AZ Alkmaar players
NEC Nijmegen players
RBC Roosendaal players
Dutch trade union leaders